San Vito al Torre is a comune (municipality) in   the Italian region Friuli-Venezia Giulia, located about  northwest of Trieste and about  southeast of Udine.

San Vito al Torre borders the following municipalities: Aiello del Friuli, Campolongo Tapogliano, Chiopris-Viscone, Medea, Palmanova, Romans d'Isonzo,   Trivignano Udinese, Visco.

Notable people from San Vito al Torre
 Ruggero Salar, football player and coach

References

External links
 Official website

Cities and towns in Friuli-Venezia Giulia